Merosargus lutzi is a species of soldier fly in the family Stratiomyidae.

Distribution
Panama, Guyana.

References

Stratiomyidae
Insects described in 1932
Diptera of North America
Diptera of South America
Taxa named by Charles Howard Curran
Fauna of Panama